Qaumi Inqilabi Party ('National Revolutionary Party') was a political party in Pakistan. It was founded in 1987 through the merger of different leftist groups. However, the party was disbanded the following year. Afrasiab Khattak and Afzal Khan Lala were leading figures in the party.

References

Political parties in Pakistan
1987 establishments in Pakistan
1988 disestablishments in Pakistan
Political parties established in 1987
Political parties disestablished in 1988